This is a list of current stations of the Oslo Tramway, Norway:

List

The following table lists the name of each station; the line the station is located on; the services (11 through 13 and 17 through 19); the date the station opened. Further details are available in the articles on each station.

References

Notes

Bibliography

External links 

 
Oslo Tramway stations
Tram